The 2007 season of the Veikkausliiga (the premier league of the Finnish football system), the 18th season in the league's history, began on April 21.

Final league table

Relegation playoff
RoPS of the Ykkönen beat FC Viikingit for a place in the 2008 season of the Veikkausliiga.

Results

European results
Champions League:
 Tampere United prevailed in the first qualifying round against S.S. Murata of San Marino, and followed up with a victory over Levski Sofia of Bulgaria, but was knocked out by Rosenborg of Norway in the third qualifying round

UEFA Cup:
 HJK won in the first qualifying round against Etzella Ettelbruck of Luxembourg, but was knocked out by Aalborg BK of Denmark in the second qualifying round
 FC Haka won in the first qualifying round against Rhyl of Wales, but was knocked out by Midtjylland of Denmark in the second qualifying round
 MyPa won in the first qualifying round against EB/Streymur of the Faroe Islands, but was knocked out by Blackburn Rovers of England in the second qualifying round
 Tampere United joined 1st round of UEFA Cup after losing in the third qualifying round of Champions League. Bordeaux won 4–3 on aggregate.

Intertoto Cup:
 FC Honka won the first round against TVMK Tallinn of Estonia, but was knocked out by Aalborg BK of Denmark in the second round

Top goal scorers
As of 13 October 2007

References
http://www.uefa.com/footballeurope/countries/association=42/standings.html
http://www.goalzz.com/main.aspx?c=2775&scorers=true

Veikkausliiga seasons
Fin
Fin
1